Edmondo Della Valle (16 November 1904–1976) was an Italian professional football player. He was born in Arce, Italy. He also held Argentine citizenship.

1904 births
1976 deaths
Association football midfielders
Calcio Foggia 1920 players
Expatriate footballers in France
Italian expatriate footballers
Italian expatriate sportspeople in France
Italian footballers
Juventus F.C. players
Ligue 1 players
OGC Nice players
S.S.C. Bari players
Serie A players
U.C. Sampdoria players